"Hey Brother" is a dance song by Swedish DJ and record producer Avicii from his debut studio album, True (2013). American bluegrass singer Dan Tyminski provides vocals for the track. It was written by Avicii, Ash Pournouri, Salem Al Fakir, Vincent Pontare and Veronica Maggio. "Hey Brother" sees Avicii giving his brother advice.

The song, which serves as the album's third single, was solicited to Australian radio on 9 October 2013 and later released on 28 October 2013 in Germany, Switzerland and Austria. In March 2014, a version of the track remixed by Avicii himself was released on his remix album True (Avicii by Avicii), this time featuring new vocals from singer Salem Al Fakir.

Composition
The song is written in the key of G minor, at a tempo in common time of 125 beats per minute. The song is in 4-4 time signature, with a 2-4 measure during parts of the chorus.

Lyric video
On 1 November 2013, the lyric video for "Hey Brother" was released onto YouTube by AviciiOfficialVEVO. The video is an assortment of stock footage clips depicting regular people and obscure events in normal everyday life such as playing basketball, Aundrea Fimbres with her face off screen having a light snack on chocolate and an olive, popcorn popping, and having a snowball fight, all in slow motion and accompanied by an animated text representation of the lyrics.

Music video
The official music video, directed by Jesse Sternbaum, was released on 9 December 2013. Loosely based on Ron Franscell's 1998 literary novel "Angel Fire",  it depicts two brothers growing up in wartime middle America. There are pictures and clips of the Vietnam War interspersed in the video. In the end of the video, it is uncovered that the younger brother thought of his brother as a dad that he didn't have. It features two boys, the older played by Zach Voss and the younger boy played by Jack Estes. The end of the video shows Avicii walking through the grass while fireflies are flying around.

A music video was also released for the Avicii by Avicii version on 9 April 2014 on Avicii's VEVO page. The video was directed by Nick Fung and Nate Olson and features clips from the Cartoon Hangover web-series Bravest Warriors. The video was released as part of "Channel 4", a project by Avicii which had several songs from his True (Avicii by Avicii) album made into music videos by various YouTube filmmakers and animators, which included Joe Penna, Keshen8, and YoMama, as well as Cartoon Hangover.

Track listing
CD single
"Hey Brother" (radio edit) – 4:14
"Hey Brother" (instrumental) – 4:14

Digital download — remixes
"Hey Brother" (Syn Cole remix) – 5:00
"Hey Brother" (extended version) – 5:30

True (Avicii by Avicii)
"Hey Brother (Avicii by Avicii)" – 6:09

Commercial performance
In the United Kingdom, after climbing for several weeks, "Hey Brother" peaked at number two on the UK Singles Chart on 15 December 2013 ― for the week ending dated 21 December 2013 ― being held off the top spot by Lily Allen's cover of "Somewhere Only We Know". It eventually spent 22 weeks in the top 40 ― 10 of which were in the top 10. In addition, "Hey Brother" peaked at the top of the UK Dance Chart. Including previous releases "I Could Be the One", "Wake Me Up" and "You Make Me", Avicii therefore reached the summit of the UK Dance Chart four times in 2013 alone. The song spent a total of six weeks at the top spot on the UK Dance Chart, ended by "Rather Be" by Clean Bandit featuring Jess Glynne.

In the United States, the song entered the Billboard Hot 100 chart at number 77 in December 2013. It continued climbing and rose to number 16 in March 2014, and reached a million in total sales that week. After Clear Channel personnel noticed the song's success at pop and adult pop radio, they asked Island Def Jam to craft a remix that showcases the song's instruments more prominently. Support for this remix enabled "Hey Brother" to debut, and peak, at number 59 on Billboards Country Airplay chart in March 2014. The song would become Avicii's final song to hit the top 40 before his death in 2018.

Charts

Weekly charts

Year-end charts

Decade-end charts

Certifications

!scope="col" colspan="3"|Streaming
|-

Release history

See also
 List of number-one dance singles of 2014 (U.S.)

References

Avicii songs
2013 songs
2013 singles
Ultratop 50 Singles (Wallonia) number-one singles
Number-one singles in Finland
Number-one singles in Germany
Number-one singles in Hungary
Number-one singles in Norway
Number-one singles in Poland
Number-one singles in Scotland
Number-one singles in Sweden
Number-one singles in Switzerland
Songs written by Avicii
Folktronica songs
Song recordings produced by Avicii
Songs written by Salem Al Fakir
Songs written by Vincent Pontare
Songs written by Veronica Maggio